Brett Deacon (born 7 March 1982 in Leicester, England) is an English former rugby union footballer who notably played for Leicester Tigers in the Premiership.  He played as a blindside flanker or No. 8.  He is the younger brother of Leicester and England international Louis Deacon. Deacon played as a replacement when Leicester won the 2007 Premiership final.

He left Leicester Tigers at the end of the 2009–10 season after seven seasons, to play for Gloucester. In 2012, after being released from Gloucester Rugby he re-joined Leicester Tigers.

On 19 December 2013, Deacon was forced to retire due to a diagnosis of lupus, an autoimmune disease which in his case led to potentially life-threatening blood clots; he was immediately placed on blood thinners. However, he remained with Leicester Tigers to take a coaching role with their academy.

References

External links
Leicester Tigers profile

1982 births
Living people
Gloucester Rugby players
Leicester Tigers players
Rugby union players from Leicestershire
Rugby union players from Leicester
Leicester Tigers coaches